Yolo or YOLO may refer to:

Phrases 
 YOLO (aphorism) ("you only live once")

Places
 Yolo, California, an unincorporated community and census-designated place
 Yolo County, California
 Yolo County Airport
Yolo City, the former name of Woodland, California
 Yolo, Mali, a village

Arts and entertainment

Music
 "YOLO" (The Lonely Island song), 2013
 "YOLO" (Band-Maid song), 2016
 YOLO (album), 2017 album by South Korean pop music group Dia
 "YOLO", a song by Madtown from their 2014 EP Mad Town

Television
 Yolo (Ghanaian TV series)
 YOLO (TV series), 2020 animated series for Adult Swim
 "YOLO" (The Simpsons), 2013 episode 
 "YOLO" (Scandal), 2013 episode of the TV series Scandal

Science and technology
 Yolo telescope, a type of reflecting telescope with tilted mirrors
 YOLO (algorithm) (You Only Look Once), an algorithm for object detection

People 
 Yolo (prince) (1625–1689), Manchu prince of the Qing dynasty
 Yolo Akili (born 1981), activist, writer, poet, counselor, and community organizer

See also
 Yolo Bypass, a flood bypass in the Sacramento Valley
 Yolo Bypass Wildlife Area, located within the Yolo Bypass
 Jolo (disambiguation)
 You Only Live Once (disambiguation)